Granon may refer to:

Grañón, village in La Rioja, Spain
Granön, Dalarna, an island and nature reserve in Lake Väsman, near Ludvika in Dalarna county, central Sweden.
Granön, Jämtland, the largest island in lake Ånnsjön in Jämtland County, Sweden.
Granön, Kalix, an island in Sweden's Kalix archipelago
Granön, Luleå, a former island, now part of Hertsön, a Swedish island in the Bothnian Bay, largely occupied by the eastern districts of the city of Luleå.
Granön, Skellefteå, a former island, now part of Halsön in Sweden's in the Skellefteå archipelago
Granön, Söderhamn, a peninsula and location of the Trollharen fishing village in the Söderhamn municipality of Sweden
Granön, Sundsvall, an island in the Gulf of Bothnia near the town of Sundsvall